Una cita de amor (English: A Date of Love) is a 1958 Mexican drama film directed by Emilio Fernández. It was entered into the 8th Berlin International Film Festival. It is based on a novel by Pedro Antonio de Alarcón.

Cast
 Silvia Pinal as Soledad
 Carlos López Moctezuma as Don Mariano
 Jaime Fernández as Róman Chávez
 José Elías Moreno as Juez de 
 Agustín Fernández as Sustituto de juez
 Guillermo Cramer as Ernesto
 Amalia Mendoza as Genoveva
 Arturo Soto Rangel as Sacerdote
 Jorge Treviño as Anunciador
 Rogelio Fernández
 Antonio León Yáñez
 Margarito Luna
 Gregorio Acosta
 Emilio Garibay

References

External links

1958 films
1950s Spanish-language films
1958 drama films
Mexican black-and-white films
Films based on works by Pedro Antonio de Alarcón
Films directed by Emilio Fernández
Mexican drama films
1950s Mexican films